George Matthew Elliott (4 July 1923 – 18 May 1996) was a Canadian short story writer.

Biography
Born in London, Ontario, Elliott attended the University of Toronto, where he was an editor for the student newspaper, The Varsity. He later became editor of the Strathroy Age-Dispatch, in Strathroy, Ontario, and was that community's correspondent for the London Free Press. He later became a reporter and editor with the Timmins Daily Press.
He was Vice-President (Creative) of MacLaren Advertising in Toronto.   He served as Minister-Counsellor for Public Affairs at the Embassy of Canada in Washington D.C. from 1976 to 1980.  He retired to St. Jean Ile d'Orleans, Quebec.

Bibliography

Short story collections

Travel/Photography

Stories

See also
Southern Ontario Gothic

References
W. H. New, ed. Encyclopedia of Literature in Canada. Toronto: University of Toronto Press, 2002: 331–32.

1923 births
1996 deaths
Canadian male short story writers
Canadian newspaper journalists
Canadian male journalists
People from Middlesex County, Ontario
University of Toronto alumni
Writers from London, Ontario
20th-century Canadian short story writers
20th-century Canadian male writers
Canadian expatriates in the United States